Arab Qarri Hajji (also Romanized as ‘Arab Qārrī Ḩājjī; also known as ‘Arab Qareh Ḩājjī) is a village in Maraveh Tappeh Rural District, in the Central District of Maraveh Tappeh County, Golestan Province, Iran. At the 2006 census, its population was 1,272, in 262 families.

References 

Populated places in Maraveh Tappeh County